

Game summaries

Week 1: vs. Louisville Brecks 

at Lakeside Park, Canton, Ohio

The Bulldogs opened their 1922 season with a win against the Louisville Brecks. Playing under a crowd of 3,000, the Bulldogs won 38 to 0. In the first quarter, Candy Miller scored a 10-yard rushing touchdown. In the second quarter, Arda Bowser had a 16-yard rushing touchdown and Ed Shaw had a rushing touch down as well. Norb Sacksteder contributed too by having a rushing touchdown in the third quarter. Chamberlin and Bowser both had rushing touchdowns in the fourth quarter. The Bulldogs' kicker, Bowser, made two and missed four extra points.

Week 2: at Dayton Triangles 

October 8, 1922, at Triangle Park

The Bulldogs' followed their victory with a 0–0 tie against the Dayton Triangles under a crowd of 3,000.

Week 3: vs. Oorang Indians 

October 15, 1922, at Lakeside Park

The Bulldog's week 3 opponent was the Oorang Indians. All of the Bulldogs' 14 points came in the third quarter: first from a 60-yard punt return by Sacksteder, then a Harry Robb rushing touchdown. With the addition of two extra points by Shaw, the Bulldogs won 13 to 0.

Week 4 (Sunday October 22, 1922): Akron Pros  

at Elk's Field, Akron, Ohio

 Game time:
 Game weather:
 Game attendance:
 Referee:

Scoring Drives:

 Canton – FG Shaw 20
 Canton – Sacksteder 38 run (kick failed)
 Canton – Carroll 19 pass from Sacksteder (kick failed)
 Canton – Robb 1 run (Shaw kick)

Week 5 (Sunday October 29, 1922): Chicago Bears  

at Cubs Park, Chicago, Illinois

 Game time:
 Game weather:
 Game attendance: 10,000
 Referee:

Scoring Drives:

 Canton – Shaw run (Shaw kick)
 Chicago Bears – E. Sternaman run (kick failed)

Week 6 (Sunday November 5, 1922): Toledo Maroons  

at Lakeside Park, Canton, Ohio

 Game time:
 Game weather:
 Game attendance:
 Referee:

Scoring Drives:

 none

Week 7 (Sunday November 12, 1922): Buffalo All-Americans  

at Lakeside Park, Canton, Ohio

 Game time:
 Game weather:
 Game attendance: 2,000
 Referee:

Scoring Drives:

 Canton – FG Shaw 30

Week 8 (Sunday November 19, 1922): Chicago Cardinals  

at Comiskey Park, Chicago, Illinois

 Game time:
 Game weather:
 Game attendance: 7,500
 Referee:

Scoring Drives

 Canton – Sacksteder 35 pass from Smyth (Henry kick)

Week 9 (Sunday November 26, 1922): Chicago Cardinals  

at Lakeside Park, Canton, Ohio

 Game time:
 Game weather:
 Game attendance: 2,500
 Referee:

Scoring Drives:

 Chicago Cardinals – FG R. Horween 35
 Canton – Roberts 1 run (Henry kick)
 Canton – Chamberlin 20 pass interception (Henry kick)
 Canton – Chamberlin 15 pass interception (kick failed)

Week 10 (Thursday November 30, 1922): Akron Pros  

at Lakeside Park, Canton, Ohio

 Game time:
 Game weather:
 Game attendance:
 Referee:

Scoring Drives:

 Canton – Chamberlin blocked punt recovery (Henry kick)
 Canton – Robb 2 run (Shaw kick)

Week 10 (Sunday December 3, 1922): Milwaukee Badgers  

at Lakeside Park, Canton, Ohio

 Game time:
 Game weather:
 Game attendance:
 Referee:

Scoring Drives:

 Canton – Elliott run (Carroll kick)
 Canton – Chamberlin 20 run (kick failed)
 Canton – Shaw 5 run (Shaw kick)
 Canton – Smyth run (kick failed)
 Canton – Shaw 1 run (Shaw kick)
 Milwaukee – McMillin 4 pass from Conzelman (kick failed)
 Canton – Chamberlin run (Shaw kick)

Week 11 (Sunday December 10, 1922): Toledo Maroons  

at Swayne Field, Toledo, Ohio

 Game time:
 Game weather:
 Game attendance: 5,000
 Referee:

Scoring Drives:

 Canton – FG Henry 45
 Canton – Elliott run (extra point on penalty)
 Canton – FG Henry 45
 Canton – Chamberlin pass from Roberts (kick failed)

Standings

References

External links 
 1922 Canton Bulldogs at Pro-Football-Reference.com

Canton Bulldogs
National Football League championship seasons
1922
Canton Bulldogs